Savage Guns (originally titled Era Sam Wallach... lo chiamavano 'così sia', and also known as His Name Was Sam Walbash, But They Call Him Amen) is a low-budget Spaghetti Western from 1971, directed by Demofilo Fidani and starring Robert Woods.

Cast

Robert Woods as Sam Wallash (credited as Robert Wood)
Dino Strano as Mash Donovan (credited as Dean Stratford)
Benito Pacifico as Hernandes (credited as Dennis Colt)
Custer Gail as Sturges
Simonetta Vitelli as  Fanny (credited as Simone Blondell)
Marina Malfatti as  Marge (uncredited)
Lincoln Tate  (uncredited)
Gordon Mitchell  (uncredited)
Peter Martell (uncredited)

References

External links
 

1971 films
1970s Italian-language films
Spaghetti Western films
Films directed by Demofilo Fidani
1971 Western (genre) films
Films scored by Lallo Gori
1970s Italian films